Stephen James Edwards (born 23 June 1951) is a former English cricketer.  Edwards was a right-handed batsman who bowled both slow left-arm orthodox and left-arm medium pace.  He was born in Highgate, Middlesex.

Edwards made his debut for Buckinghamshire in the 1985 Minor Counties Championship against the Somerset Second XI.  Edwards played Minor counties cricket for Buckinghamshire from 1985 to 1992, which included 33 Minor Counties Championship matches and 6 MCCA Knockout Trophy matches.  In 1987, he made his List A debut against Somerset in the NatWest Trophy.  He played 2 further List A matches for Buckinghamshire, the last coming against Sussex in the 1992 NatWest Trophy.  He also played a single List A match for the combined Minor Counties cricket team in the 1988 Benson & Hedges Cup against Nottinghamshire.  In total, Edwards played 4 List A matches, scoring 29 runs and taking 3 wickets at a bowling average of 41.33, with best figures of 2/14.

He also played Second XI cricket for the Essex Second XI in 1976.

References

External links
Stephen Edwards at ESPNcricinfo
Stephen Edwards at CricketArchive

1951 births
Living people
People from Highgate
English cricketers
Buckinghamshire cricketers
Minor Counties cricketers